Charles Chen may refer to:
 Blackie Chen (born 1977), Taiwanese actor and former basketball player
 Chen Chan-siang (1916–2001), Chinese architect and urban planner
 Chen I-hsin (born 1972), Taiwanese politician
 Chen Yidan (born 1971), Chinese entrepreneur and philanthropist
 Charles Chen Seong Fook, Malaysian sport shooter who competed at the 2001 Southeast Asian Games and the 2010, 2014, 2018 Commonwealth Games